Just Whitney is the fifth studio album by American singer and actress Whitney Houston, released on November 27, 2002, by Arista Records. It was her first studio album to be released after her greatest hits compilation, Whitney: The Greatest Hits (2000), and the follow-up to her multi-platinum fourth studio album, My Love is Your Love (1998). Just Whitney was also Houston's first to be released after re-signing her contract with Arista in 2001 for $100 million - the largest recording contract for a female artist at the time.

In the United States, Just Whitney debuted at number nine on the Billboard 200 and number three on the  Top R&B/Hip-Hop Albums chart, with sales of 205,147 copies in the first week. That beat the previous high first-week sales of 177,284 copies with the Waiting to Exhale soundtrack, and also logged her highest debut sales out of her Nielsen SoundScan-era albums at the time of its release.

The album spawned four singles (in order), "Whatchulookinat", "One of Those Days", "Try It on My Own", and "Love That Man", with the first, third and fourth singles peaking at number one on Billboards Dance Club Songs chart. "Try It on My Own" also peaked at number ten on Billboards Adult Contemporary chart. Just Whitney has sold over 2.5 million copies worldwide and has also earned Platinum certification in the United States and Switzerland, and Gold in France, Brazil and other countries. In 2003, the album was nominated at the Soul Train Lady of Soul Awards in the category for Best R&B/Soul Album of the Year.

Background and production
Just Whitney is Houston's fifth studio album, that she recorded after renewing her contract with Arista for a record $100 million. It is mixed with R&B ballads, R&B mid-tempo numbers, and dance songs. It also includes a rock song, "Tell Me No". Houston said that she wanted to make a "very soul oriented" album, something she felt was missing on the radio. It was somewhat a departure from her previous studio album My Love Is Your Love, which was blended with R&B, hip hop, and reggae.

She worked with Kenneth "Babyface" Edmonds, with whom she had worked with previously, and Kevin "She'kspere" Briggs. Other producers included Missy Elliott, Teddy Bishop, Gordon Chambers, Rob Fusari, and Troy Taylor. Her then-husband, recording artist Bobby Brown, also co-produced one of the songs.

According to Houston,

She also said that she wanted to give something to the fans, songs which they can sing along to and love the melody. She also incorporated samples into her songs such as in "One of Those Days" ㅡ album's second single, which sampled The Isley Brothers' song "Between the Sheets". She also covered Debby Boone's classic "You Light Up My Life". The album also contains the rock influenced "Tell Me No", which was produced by Babyface, who also produced some other songs on the album including the ballad "Try It on My Own" and dance-pop song "Love That Man" ㅡ both of which became singles. The song "Whatchulookinat" was produced by Brown and Mohammad 2G and became the project's lead single. The song, co-written by Houston, was taken by critics as an answer to the media for deeply invading her personal life.

Critical reception

Upon its release, Just Whitney received mixed reviews from critics, with aggregated reviews on Metacritic awarding the album 53 out of 100. Craig Seymour of Atlanta Journal and Constitution gave the album a favorable review stating, "On Just Whitney, Houston comes off as warm, lucid, open, and sharp. Keysha Davis of BBC gave a favorable review commenting, "With one of the exceptional voices in contemporary music, her latest album, aptly titled Just Whitney sees the diva return to her former glory with a combination of high-voltage ballads and smooth-liqueur R&B. [...] Whitney's return to big ballads will hopefully ensure that this pop princess will be able to lead the rest of her life like a clichéd fairy tale - happily ever after." Mike Bell from Jam! Showbiz, was also favorable in his review, saying "Maybe because of everything that's happened in her past, maybe because of the sideshow, she has the ability to give the songs real feeling, real life." In addition, he stated that her voice was in fine form, "showcasing those incredible pipes that launched a thousand imitators." He concluded by saying, "And it shows up all of those followers with recent releases ㅡ including Mariah Carey and Celine Dion ㅡ because not only does Houston have the lungs, but she has the soul."

Jon Pareles of New York Times wrote, "Ms. Houston's voice sails and spirals through breathy ballads, staccato constructions and big-build anthems; she's strategic and improvisatory at the same time." He summarized by saying that even when she's seething, she's graceful. Angus Batey from Yahoo! Music UK & Ireland graded the album seven stars out of ten commenting, "[...] this is a cogent, compact and really quite good record, one that mixes upbeat, perhaps slightly clinical R&B with uber-ballads and occasional snatches of what appears to be an attempt at intimacy." Stephen Thomas Erlewine of Allmusic commented that Just Whitney was "an assertion that she's returning to her basics." He also said that "It would be a good standard-issue Whitney album if it wasn't for her disarming, defensive attempt to defuse every rumor hurled in her direction." Billboard reviewed the album commenting that "Just Whitney appears and sounds more like a work-in-progress than a finished disk." Steve Jones of USA Today graded the album fairly well, giving it two-and-half stars out of four, but stating, "At her best, Houston is full of sass and attitude and, most of all, joy. But with so much emphasis on what's bothering her, you can't help but wonder whether the thrill is gone." According to The Guardian, the album takes "a musical step backwards". Tom Sinclair of Entertainment Weekly graded the album a solid B- and noted that Just Whitney had quite a refreshingly "old-school vibe." He commented, "Whatever her personal problems, our gal  sounds plucky and on top of her game. Still, in her third decade as a diva, Houston remains a formidable role model for American Idol wannabes."

Commercial performance
On the week ending December 28, 2002, Just Whitney debuted and peaked at number nine on the Billboard 200 and number three on Top R&B/Hip-Hop Albums. The album spent 26 weeks on the US Album chart. It was certified platinum by the Recording Industry Association of America (RIAA) for shipments exceeding one million copies. Since its release, the album has sold 1.3 million copies in the US and roughly 1.2 million copies outside the US for total sales of 2.5 million copies.

In Australia, the album reached number 22 on the ARIA Urban Albums Chart. The album debuted at number 85 on the Canadian Albums chart, selling 3,000 copies in its first week. In Austria, it entered the albums chart on December 8, 2002 at its peak position of number 33. In Switzerland, the album saw its second highest peak, when it debuted at number 10 on the charts. It was certified Platinum by the IFPI Switzerland for shipment/sales of 30,000 copies or more. In France, the album charted at number 25 and was certified Gold, for shipment of 50,000 copies. In the Netherlands, it peaked at number 70 on the albums chart. Just Whitney was certified Gold in Brazil. In the UK, it peaked at number 76. The album has sold more than 2.5 million copies worldwide.

Singles
The album saw the release of four official singles - two preceding and two succeeding the album's release.

"Whatchulookinat" became the album's lead single released on September 17, 2002. The song received mixed to unfavorable reviews from critics. The single became a moderate success worldwide, peaking inside the top forty in most countries. In the US, it became her tenth Hot Dance Club Play topper. The corresponding music video was also considered as Houston's answer to the media for getting too deep into her personal life. The video showed a white set with cameras all over, following Houston's every move. The set was also full with old movie cameras and people dressed as reporters and photographers. Houston is shown dancing in front of them.

"One of Those Days" was the album's second single and was released on October 29, 2002. The song received many positive reviews from critics. It sampled The Isley Brothers' song "Between the Sheets". The single was a moderate success in the US. The accompanying music video's plot revolved around Houston and her friends, having a day for themselves and going to the club at night.

"Try It on My Own" became the project's third single and was released on February 11, 2003. The song received acclaim from critics as well as fans; most of them who named it as the album's highlight. The song, like its predecessors, was a moderate success and topped Billboard Hot Dance Music/Club Play chart. It also reached the top ten on the US Adult Contemporary chart. Internationally, the song performed fair. A music video was released to promote the single.

"Love That Man" was the fourth and final single from the album, released on May 20, 2003. It became another Dance Club chart-topping single, but failed to make the Hot 100. No accompanying video was released for the single.

Promotion
To promote the album, Houston appeared on the 2002 MTV Europe Music Awards, performing her new single "Whatchulookinat". She also appeared on the 2003 VH1 Divas Duets: An Honors Concert for the VH1 Save the Music Foundation and performed her hits including two songs from the album; "My Love" and "Try It on My Own". Apart from these, she also performed "One of Those Days" and "Tell Me No" live on Good Morning America. No major tours were arranged to support the album.

Track listing

Notes 
 on international editions, "Try It on My Own" is labeled as "On My Own".
 denotes co-producer

Personnel
Adapted from AllMusic.

 Joey Arbagey – A&R
 Babyface –  drum programming, guest artist, acoustic guitar, keyboards, producer, background vocals
 Tom Bender – assistant
 Charile "CSUN" Bereal –  producer
 Kenny Bereal –  producer
 Ted Bishop – arranger,  drum programming, engineer, keyboards, producer, vocal arrangement
 Paul Boutin – engineer
 Kevin "She'kspere" Briggs – arranger, engineer, midi, producer
 Bobby Brown – featured artist, guest artist, primary artist, producer
 Matt Brown – assistant
 Melanie Byrd – production coordination
 Terrence Cash – engineer
 Gordon Chambers –  producer, vocal arrangement, vocal producer, background vocals
 Greg Charley –  guitar
 Kevin KD Davis – mixing
 Nathan East – bass
 Missy Elliott –  producer
 Cortez Farris – engineer
 Steve Fisher – assistant
 Roxanna Floy – make-Up
 Sherree Ford-payne – background vocals
 Rob Fusari –  producer 
 Jon Gass – mixing
 Steve Genewick – assistant
 Sharlotte Gibson – background vocals
 Kevin Guarnieri – engineer
 Mick Guzauski – mixing
 Gary Houston – background vocals
 Whitney Houston –  primary artist, producer, vocal arrangement, vocals, background vocals
 Jimmy Hoyson – assistant
 Kenya Ivey – background vocals
 Scott Kieklak – engineer
 Latrelle – background vocals
 Ellin La Var – hair stylist
 Ricky Lawson – drums
 Marc Stephen Lee – assistant
 Wayne Linsey – fender rhodes
 Manny Marroquin – mixing
 Bill Meyers – string arrangements, string conductor
 Ricky Minor – producer
 Muhammad2G – producer
 Sheryl Nields – photography
 Joe-mama nitzberg – Creative Director
 Greg Phillinganes – piano
 Josean Posey – assistant
 Herb Powers – mastering
 L.A. Reid – executive producer
 Dennis Rivadeneira – assistant
 Jeffrey Schulz – art direction, design
 Ivy Skoff – production coordination
 Antonique Smith – background vocals
 Patrice "ButtaPhly" Stewart –  vocal producer
 Craig "Niteman" Taylor – assistant
 Shawndella Taylor – A&R
 Troy Taylor –  producer, programming, rhythm arrangements, vocal producer
 Michael Hart Thompson – guitar
 Tweet – vocal producer, background vocals
 Tommy Vicari – string engineer
 Randy Waldman – string arrangements, string conductor
 Mike White – engineer
 Patti Wilson – stylist
 Theresa Wilson – A&R
 Jeffrey "Woody" Woodruff – string engineer

Charts

Weekly charts

Monthly charts

Year-end charts

Certifications and sales

References

External links
 Just Whitney at Discogs

2002 albums
Albums produced by Missy Elliott
Albums produced by Troy Taylor (record producer)
Whitney Houston albums
Arista Records albums
Albums produced by L.A. Reid
Albums produced by Babyface (musician)
Hip hop soul albums
Albums produced by Whitney Houston